The men's 1500 meter at the 2021 KNSB Dutch Single Distance Championships in Heerenveen took place at the Thialf ice skating rink on Saturday 31 October 2020. There were 18 participants.

Statistics

Result

Source:

Referee: Berri de Jonge.  Assistant: Rieks van Lubek  Starter: Jan Rosing

Draw

References

Single Distance Championships
2021 Single Distance